, provisionally known as , is a resonant trans-Neptunian object that resides in the Kuiper belt in the outermost region of the Solar System. It was discovered on August 19, 2001 by Marc W. Buie.  is a plutino, meaning that it is locked in a 3:2 orbital resonance with Neptune, much like Pluto.

Physical characteristics
The result was 408.2 km.

In the visible light, the object appears to have a neutral or slightly red color.

Dwarf planet candidate
When first discovered,  was calculated to have an absolute magnitude (H) of 4.7.

References

External links
 
 

469372
Discoveries by Marc Buie
469372
20010819